The Gympie Region is a local government area in the Wide Bay–Burnett region of Queensland, Australia, about  north of Brisbane, the state capital. It is between the Sunshine Coast and Hervey Bay and centred on the town of Gympie. It was created in 2008 from a merger of the Shires of Cooloola and Kilkivan and part of the Shire of Tiaro.

The Regional Council, which governs the Region, has an estimated operating budget of A$50 million.

History 
Gubbi Gubbi (Kabi Kabi, Cabbee, Carbi, Gabi Gabi) is an Australian Aboriginal language spoken on Gubbi Gubbi country. The Gubbi Gubbi language region includes the landscape within the local government boundaries of the Sunshine Coast Region and Gympie Region, particularly the towns of Caloundra, Noosa Heads, Gympie and extending north towards Maryborough and south to Caboolture.

Prior to the 2008 amalgamation, the Gympie Region existed as four distinct local government areas:

 the Shire of Cooloola;
 the City of Gympie;
 the Shire of Widgee;
 the Shire of Kilkivan;
 and Division 3 (Theebine/Gunalda areas) of the Shire of Tiaro.

The Gympie area was originally settled for grazing purposes.  The discovery of gold in 1867 led to a gold rush and the development of the Mary River valley for closer agricultural pursuits.

The Widgee Divisional Board was incorporated on 11 November 1879 under the Divisional Boards Act 1879. On 3 July 1886, its western part separately incorporated as the Division of Kilkivan. With the passage of the Local Authorities Act 1902, both Widgee and Kilkivan became shires on 31 March 1903. On 21 November 1940, the Widgee Shire Council moved into new premises formerly occupied by the Bank of New South Wales at 242 Mary Street, Gympie.

The Municipal Borough of Gympie was incorporated on 25 June 1880, holding its first elections on 25 August. A town hall was built in 1890. It became a town under the new Act on 31 March 1903, and on 7 January 1905 was proclaimed a city by the Governor of Queensland.

On 2 November 1993, the Shire of Widgee and the City of Gympie merged under the terms of the Local Government (Shire of Cooloola) Regulation 1993 to form the Shire of Cooloola. The first elections were held on 27 November 1993 and Adrian McClintock, the former Widgee chairman, was elected for a four-year term.

In July 2007, the Local Government Reform Commission released its report and recommended that Cooloola and Kilkivan amalgamate with part of the Shire of Tiaro. The first two councils opposed amalgamation, but in the event of amalgamation, thought the Commission's proposal the best option. Tiaro wished to amalgamate with the Shire of Woocoo and opposed the plan.

On 15 March 2008, the three shires ceased to exist, and elections were held on the same day to elect eight councillors and a mayor to the Regional Council. Ron Dyne, the former mayor of Kilkivan, was elected as the region's first mayor. The former Cooloola Shire Council Chambers is now used as the Gympie Regional Council Chambers.

Wards
The council remains undivided and its elected body consists of eight councillors and a mayor, elected for a four-year term.

Current Councillors/Mayor 
The mayor of the Gympie Regional Council is Glen Charles Hartwig. Mayor Glen Hartwig was elected in the Gympie Regional Council election on Saturday, 28 March 2020.

The councillors are:,
Jess Milne – Division 1
Nadine Jensen – Division 2
Shane Waldock – Division 3
 Bruce Devereaux – Division 4
 Dan Stewart – Division 5
 Hilary Smerdon – Division 6
 Warren Polley – Division 7
 Robert Fredman – Division 8

Mayors 
 2008–2014 : Ron Dyne 
 2015–2020 : Mick Curran 
 2020–present : Glen Hartwig

Towns and localities
The Gympie Region includes the following settlements:

Gympie area:
 Gympie
 Araluen
 Chatsworth
 Glanmire
 Jones Hill
 Kybong
 Monkland
 Nahrunda
 Southside
 Tamaree
 The Dawn
 Two Mile
 Veteran
 Victory Heights
 Woondum

Widgee area:
 Amamoor
 Bollier
 Brooloo
 Calico Creek
 Canina
 Carters Ridge
 Cedar Pocket
 Cooloola
 Cooloola Cove
 Dagun
 Glastonbury
 Goomboorian
 Greens Creek
 Imbil
 Kandanga
 Kia Ora
 Lagoon Pocket
 Langshaw
 Melawondi
 Mothar Mountain
 Moy Pocket
 North Deep Creek
 Pie Creek
 Rainbow Beach
 Tandur
 The Palms
 Tin Can Bay1
 Traveston
 Wallu
 Wilsons Pocket

Kilkivan area:
 Kilkivan
 Booubyjan
 Cinnabar
 Goomeri
 Johnstown
 Kinbombi
 Lower Wonga
 Manumbar
 Tansey
 Widgee
 Woolooga

South Tiaro - Division 3 area:
 Anderleigh
 Curra
 Glen Echo
 Gunalda
 Miva
 Neerdie
 Scotchy Pocket
 Theebine

1 - split with Fraser Coast Region

Libraries 
The Gympie Regional Council operate public libraries at Goomeri, Gympie, Imbil, Kilkivan, Rainbow Beach, and Tin Can Bay.

Local heritage register 
The Gympie Regional Council established and maintains the Gympie Local Heritage Register.

Population
The populations given relate to the component entities prior to 2008. Estimates for the Tiaro component, not included in the figures below, are: 1,315 (1991); 1,695 (1996); 1,789 (2001) and 2,197 (2006).

See also
Great Sandy Biosphere Reserve

References

External links
 Gympie Regional Council website

 
Gympie
Wide Bay–Burnett
2008 establishments in Australia